Safronov is a rural locality (a khutor) in Zakharovskoye Rural Settlement, Kotelnikovsky District, Volgograd Oblast, Russia. The population was 167 as of 2010. There are 4 streets.

Geography 
Safronov is located on the bank of the Tsimlyansk Reservoir, 17 km northwest of Kotelnikovo (the district's administrative centre) by road. Zakharov is the nearest rural locality.

References 

Rural localities in Kotelnikovsky District